The Savoia-Marchetti SM.62 was an Italian single-engine maritime patrol flying boat produced from 1926. It served with the Regia Aeronautica and with a number of foreign users, and was licence-produced in Spain and the Soviet Union. Some of the Spanish aircraft were still in service during the Spanish Civil War

Design and development
The SM.62 flying boat was one of the main successes of Savoia-Marchetti, evolved from the SM.59 which first flew in 1925.

The single-engine, single-spar wing, wooden biplane aircraft was powered by a single Isotta Fraschini Asso 500 R.I.,  engine mounted between the upper and the lower wings, and drove a pusher propeller.

Apart from the two machine guns in the aft and forward fuselage, both mounted in uncovered positions, the possibility of fitting an Oerlikon 20 mm cannon was explored, but never put into service.

The progress of the project was almost continuous, and the following year saw the SM.62bis development that had a more powerful engine. This aircraft, with a  wingspan, formed the basis of the future SM.78. For those times, these were respectable performance figures for a single-engine aircraft.

This was the most successful Italian flying boat outside Italy, with at least one being acquired by Japan for its naval aviation service, several by Romania, and 40 by Spain, some of which were license-built. The USSR acquired the license to construct the SM.62bis in Taganrog plants as the MBR-4, with many examples built.

Romania also acquired the licence to construct the SM.62bis, at the IAR factory in Brașov. Five such flying boats were produced in 1936.

Despite their obsolescence, several Spanish examples fought in the Spanish Civil War. Since the aircraft of those times were not capable of great speeds, several were used at the Desenzano "high-speed flying-school" in Italy, as well as continuing to serve as reconnaissance-bombers. The next derivative, the SM.78, with over a ton more weight and 20% more power; could carry a greater fuel load, effectively doubling the range; and was slightly faster than the SM.62bis.

Variants
SM.621926
SM.62PCivil version.
SM.62bis1927, powered by a  Isotta Fraschini Asso 750 W-18 engine.
SM.62ter
MBR-4 Soviet production of the SM.62bis at Taganrog

Operators
 
Regia Aeronautica
 
Imperial Japanese Navy Air Service
 
Royal Romanian Naval Aviation (11 units)
 
Spanish Republican Air Force
 
Spanish Air Force – Post civil war.
 
Soviet Naval Aviation

Specifications (SM.62)

See also

References

Bibliography

Further reading

Lembo, Daniele SM.78, Storia Militare N.19, Westward editions, pagg. 43–49.

SM.062
1920s Italian patrol aircraft
Flying boats
Single-engined pusher aircraft
Biplanes